The Quaternion Eagle, also known as the Imperial Quaternion Eagle or simply Imperial Eagle, was an informal coat of arms of the Holy Roman Empire.

Introduced around 1510 by Hans Burgkmair, the Quaternion Eagle mixed two pre-existing concepts: the Imperial Quaternions and the Imperial Eagle (double-headed eagle).

History

Background

The so-called imperial quaternions (from )
were a conventional representation of the Imperial States of the Holy Roman Empire which first became current in the 15th century and was extremely popular during the 16th century.

Apart from the highest tiers of the emperor, kings, prince-bishops and the prince electors, the estates are represented in groups of four. The number of quaternions was usually ten, in descending order of precedence:
 Dukes (Duces),
 Margraves (Marchiones),
 Landgraves  (Comites Provinciales),
 Burggraves (Comites Castrenses),
 Counts (Comites),
 Knights (Milites),
 Noblemen (Liberi),
 Cities (Metropoles),
 Villages (Villae),
 Peasants (Rustici).

The list could be shortened or expanded, by the mid-16th century to as many as 45.
 
It is likely that this system was first introduced under Emperor Sigismund, who is assumed to have commissioned the frescoes in Frankfurt city hall in 1414.

As has been noted from an early time, this representation of the "imperial constitution" does not in fact represent the actual constitution of the Holy Roman Empire, as some imperial cities appear as "villages" or even "peasants" and the Burggrave of Stromburg was an unknown entity even at the time. The representation of imperial subjects is also far from complete. The "imperial quaternions" are, rather, a more or less random selection intended to represent pars pro toto the structure of the imperial constitution.

Coat of the Empire 

Over its long history, the Holy Roman Empire used many different heraldic forms, representing its numerous internal divisions.
One rendition of the coat of the empire was the Quaternion Eagle, printed by David de Negker of Augsburg after a 1510 woodcut by Hans Burgkmair.

Named after the imperial quaternions, it showed a selection of 56 shields of various Imperial States in groups of four on the feathers of a double-headed eagle (the imperial eagle's remiges), supporting, in place of a shield, Christ on the Cross.

The top shields were those of the Prince Electors and the titular Prefect of Rome, being divided into two horizontal quaternions:
 the ecclesiastical: Trier, Cologne, Mainz and the Prefect of Rome on the right wing;
 the secular: Bohemia, Palatinate, Saxony and Brandenburg on the left.
Twelve vertical quaternions were shown under them, as follows — eight dukes being divided into two quaternions called "pillars" and "vicars", respectively:

 Right wing
1. Seill ("pillars"),
3. Marggrauen (margraves),
5. Burggrauen (burggraves),
7. Semper freie (nobles),
9. Stett (cities),
11. Bauern (peasants),

 Left wing
2. Vicari ("vicars"),
4. Lantgrauen (landgraves),
6. Grauen (counts),
8. Ritter (knights),
10. Dörfer (villages),
12. Birg (castles).

The depiction also appeared on the Imperial Eagle beaker.

Imperial Eagle beaker

See also
 Coats of arms of the Holy Roman Empire
 Reichsadler
 Imperial Eagle
 Imperial Quaternions

Notes and references

Notes

References

Bibliography

External links

 

Imperial Eagle
Heraldry of the Holy Roman Empire